The following is an incomplete list of county-maintained roads in Pine County, Minnesota, United States.

Within Pine County, a County Road (CR) is referred to as a "Highway" if a sealed road and "Road" if an improved road. Though some of them are county state aid highways (CSAH), all Pine County roads and highways bear the black and white standard square shield for County Routes rather than having the CSAH bearing the blue and gold pentagonal M1-6 shield for those that are CSAH designated routes.

The procedure of Pine County referring to the plurality of its county routes as a county highway rather than a county road is an anomaly in Minnesota; whereas with most other counties in Minnesota, the opposite method is followed for addressing the name of a county route.

CR 1–CR 25
County Highway 1 is a discontinuous road that serves Greeley and Royalton Township. Woodland Road continues as County Road 115.

County Highway 2 is a road that serves Rock Creek.

County Highway 3 is a road that serves Rock Creek and Pine City Township.

County Highway 4 is a road that serves Rock Creek and Pine City Township.

County Road and Highway 5 is a road that serves Pine City Township and Royalton Township.

County Highway 6 is a road that serves Pine City Township and Royalton Township.

County Highway 7 is a road that serves Pine City, Pine City Township, Royalton Township, Pokegama Township and Grasston. The approximately  road begins as continuation Pine Street (Kanabec CR 23) in Grasston, which becomes Pokegama Lake Road upon entering Pine County. Pokegama Lake Road generally heads east and north until reaching its intersection with Interstate Highway 35, enters Pine City as Hillside Avenue Southwest, and terminates at its intersection with Main Street (CR 61). Though the short segment of Pine Street in Grasston between the county line and State Highway 107 (MN 107) is designated as Kanabec CR 23, the sign for the short segment is that of Pine CR 7. The segment within Pine City was originally signed as former State Highway 324 (MN 324) until 2003.

County Highway 8 is a road that serves Pine City Township and Pine City. The approximately  road begins at the intersection of Ravine Road (CR 117) and St. Croix Road (CR 118), heads west into Pine City on St. Croix Road, then on St. Croix Road Southeast, heads north on 2nd Street Southeast, heads west on 3rd Avenue Southeast, and terminating at 6th Street (CR 61).

County Highway 9 is a road that serves Pine City, Pine City Township, Chegwatana Township and Pokegama Township, Pine County, Minnesota.

County Highway 10 is a road that serves Chengwatana.

County Highway 11 is a road that serves Pine City, Pokegama Township and Henriette.

County Road 12 is a road that serves Pokegama Township and Henriette.

County Highway and Road 13 is a road that serves Pokegama Township, Brook Park Township and Brook Park.

County Highway 14 is a road that serves Chengwatana Township, Munch Township, Pokegama Township, Beroun, Mission Creek Township and Brook Park Township.

County Highway 15 is a road that serves Munch Township, Mission Creek Township, Barry Township and Hinckley. The road begins at the intersection of Beroun Crossing Road (CR 14) with Hinckley Road, heads north on Hinckley Road for  into Hinckley and terminates at State Highway 48 (MN 48).

County Road 16 is a road that serves Mission Creek Township.

County Road and Highway 17 is a road that serves Mission Creek Township, Hinckley Township and Dell Grove Township.

County Highway 18 is a road that serves Hinckley and Hinckley Township. The road continues west as 300th Avenue (Kanabec CR 3).

County Road 19 is a road that serves Munch Township and Barry Township.

County Road and Highway 20 is a road that serves Barry Township and Sandstone Township.

County Highway and Road 21 is a road that serves Crosby Township and Arlone Township.

County Highway and Road 22 is a road that serves Crosby Township, Clover Township, Danforth Township, Fleming Township, Bruno Township and Bruno. The County Highway begins at St. Croix River at the former Fleming Landing now located in St. Croix State Park, generally heads west and north on St. Croix Park Road, briefly heads east, concurrently on State Highway 48 (MN 48), continues to head generally north on Fleming Logging Road.

County Highway 23 is a road that serves Rock Creek and Pine City Township. It begins as a continuation of Falcon Avenue (Chisago CR 9), heads north on Falcon Avenue, heads east on 570th Street, heads north on Fairway Road, and terminating at its intersection with Pokegama Lake Road (CR 7).

County Highway and Road 24 is a road that serves Ogema Township, Wilma Township and New Dosey Township.

County Highway 25 is a road that serves Arna Township and Wilma Township. It begins at the Minnesota-Wisconsin border at the intersection of State Line Road with Markville Road, generally heads west and north on Markville Road, and terminates at its intersection with Tamarack River Road (CR 24).

CR 26–CR 50
County Highway and Road 26 is a road that serves Dell Grove Township and Friesland.

County Highway 27 is a road that serves Dell Grove Township.

County Highway 28 is a road that serves Dell Grove Township and Sandstone Township.

County Highway 29 is a road that serves Sandstone Township and Sandstone. Located on the southwestern border of the city, the  road is routed the entire length of Prison Road, connecting the Federal Correctional Institution, Sandstone, with State Highway 123 (MN 123).

County Highway 30 is a road that serves Sandstone Township, Danforth Township, Wilma Township and Duxbury. Duxbury Road continues eastward as County Road 141.

County Road 31 is a road that serves Markville, Arna Township, New Dosey Township and Cloverton.

County Highway and Road 32 is a road that serves Askov, Partridge Township, Fleming Township, New Dosey Township and Cloverton. The County Highway begins at its intersection with State Highway 23 (MN 23), heads east on Brogade in Askov, continues to head east on Guvernors Vej, and upon leaving Askov continues to head west on Rutabaga Road until its intersection with Wolf Creek Road (CR 22 / CR 146). Upon entering Cloverton on Rutabaga Road, the road again becomes a County Highway and continues east for approximately another  into Wisconsin, continuing as Douglas CR T, heading into Cozy Corner.

County Highway and Road 33 is a road that serves Askov, Partridge Township, Norman Township, Kettle River Township and Rutledge.

County Highway 34 is a road serving Finlayson, Finlayson Township, Groningen and Kettle River Township. It begins at its intersection with State Highway 18 (MN 18) in Finlayson, as a continuation of Scotch Pine Road (CR 144), heads north  on Scotch Pine Road, and terminates at its intersection with Rutledge Road (CR 39). Scotch Pine Road continues north as CR 151.

County Highway 35 is a road serving Dell Grove Township, Groningen, Pine Lake Township and Finlayson. It begins at the interchange with Old Highway 61/Lake Road (CR 61) and Finlayson Road (CR 27), heads north  on Finlayson Road, and terminates at its intersection with State Highway 18 (MN 18) in Finlayson.

County Highway 36 is a road serving Dell Grove Township and Pine Lake Township. It begins at its intersection with Groningen Road (CR 28), heads north  on Dell Road, heads east  on Korpi Road, becomes a County Highway and heads north  on Norway Spruce Road, and terminates at its intersection with Rutledge Road (CR 39). Norway Spruce Road continues north as (CR 150).

County Highway 37 is a short County Highway serving Pine Lake Township. It begins at its intersection with 100th Avenue/Big Pine Road (CR 38), heads east  on Big Pine Cutoff, and terminates with its intersection with State Highway 18 (MN 18).

County Highway 38 is a short County Highway serving Pine Lake Township in Pine County and Wagner Township in Aitkin County.

County Highway 39 is a County Highway serving Rutledge, Kettle River Township and Bremen Township. It begins in Rutledge at its intersection with Pine Street (CR 61), heads west  on Rutledge Road, and terminates at its intersection with Norway Spruce Road (CR 36/CR 150). Norway Spruce Road continues west, but without a highway designation.

County Road and Highway 40 is a road that serves, Bremen Township and Birch Creek Township, and Denham. Heading east  on Soo Line Road, CR 40 becomes a County Highway and enters Denham from the west, continues to head north  on Denham Road to its intersection with Farm to Market Road (CR 46), returns to being a County Road, continues north for additional , and continues northward as Carlton CR 17.

County Highway and Road 41 is a road that serves Bremen Township, Kettle River Township and Willow River. The road continues west as 220th Street (Aitkin CR 2).

County Road 42 is a road that serves Kettle River Township and Sturgeon Lake Township.

County Highway 43 is a road that serves Bruno, Bruno Township, Norman Township, Kettle River Township and Willow River. The Highway terminates at its intersection with Cross Street (CR 61).

County Road 44 is a road that serves Bruno Township.

County Road 45 is a road that serves Bruno Township.

County Highway and Road 46 is a road that serves Kerrick, Kerrick Township, Windemere Township, Sturgeon Lake, Sturgeon Lake Township and Birch Creek Township. The western segment heads west on 2nd Avenue, heads south on Market Street, heads northwest and west on Bryan Street. Upon leaving the county, the road continues as 260th Street (Aitkin CR 34).

County Highway and Road 47 is a road that serves Duquette and Kerrick Township. The county highway begins at its intersection with State Highway 23 (MN 23) and Oak Leaf Road in Duquette, heads northwest on Oak Leaf Road out of Duquette and becomes a county road. The road continues west as Oak Leaf Road (CR 162).

County Highway 48 is a road that serves Kerrick Township, Pine County and Moose Lake Township, Carlton County.

County Road 49 is a road that serves Kerrick Township. The road continues north into Carlton County as Red Hill Road (Carlton CR 13).

County Highway 50 is a road that serves Windemere Township.

CR 51–CR 66
County Highway 51 is a road that serves Windemere Township. The route begins its intersection with Lakeland Road (CR 46), heads north and northwest, paralleling Interstate Highway 35 on the east side on East Frontage Road and terminates at its intersection with County Line Road (Carlton CR 10).

County Highway and Road 52 is a road that serves Sturgeon Lake Township, Birch Creek Township and Denham.

County Highway 53 is a road that serves Pokegama Township. The route begins at the intersection of Pokegama Lake Road (CR 7) and Tigua Road, generally heads north and east on Tigua Road, and terminates at its intersection with Henriette Road (CR 11).

County Highway 54 is a road that serves Mission Creek Township. The route begins at the intersection of Beroun Crossing Road (CR 14) with Frontage Road, heads north on Frontage Road as it parallels on the west side of Interstate Highway 35, heads west on Two Creek Road, heads north on Wildwood Road, and terminates at its intersection with State Highway 23 (MN 23) between Brook Park and Hinckley.

County Highway and Road 55 is a road that serves Pine City and Pokegama Township. The route begins on the north end of Pine City, at the intersection of 6th Street (CR 61) with Airport Road, heads east on Airport Road Northeast, heads north on Airwaves Road Northeast, heads east on Visions Road Northeast, heads north on Crossway Road Northeast, heads west on Everready Road, and terminates at its intersection with County Highway 61.

County Highway 56 is a road that serves Kerrick Township.

County Highway 60 is a road that serves Finlayson. The route begins at the intersection of State Highway 18 (MN 18) with Broadway Street, heads south 1 block on South Broadway Street, heads east 2 blocks on Finland Avenue, heads north 1 block on Front Street and terminates at its intersection with MN 18.

County Highway 61 is a road that serves through Pine County, roughly paralleling Interstate Highway 35. The roadway is part of the former alignment of U.S. 61, and the stretch of the road between Rock Creek and Pine City was designated as part of State Highway 361 (MN 361) until it was turned back to Pine County maintenance in 2003. County Highway 61 continues north along Old Highway 61 through Barry Township, Dell Grove Township, then heads east on Lake Road through Sandstone Township, terminating at its intersection with Interstate 35 and MN 23. County Highway 61 continues north in Finlayson Township at its intersection with State Highway 18 (MN 18), east of Finlayson, passes through Rutledge, Kettle River Township, Willow River, Sturgeon Lake Township, Sturgeon Lake and Windemere Township. Pine County Highway 61 continues northward as Carlton County Road 61.

In Hinckley, County Highway 61 Spur, designated as a branch of CSAH 61 along Fire Monument Road, also exists, connecting the terminus of State Highway 48 (MN 48) at Interstate 35 with Old Highway 61 (CSAH 61).

County Highway 62 is a road that serves Hinckley. The route begins at the intersection of Monument Road (CR 61) and Lawler Avenue North, heads north on Lawler Avenue North for 7.5 blocks, and terminates at its intersection with Old Highway 61 (CR 61).

County Highway 63 is a road that serves Brook Park. The route begins at the intersection of 3rd Street (CR 13) with 2nd Avenue (CR 13 / CR 131), heads north for 2 blocks on 3rd Street, and terminates at its intersection with State Highway 23 (MN 23).

County Highway 64 is a road that serves Sandstone. The route begins at the intersection of Main Street / State Highway 123 (MN 123) and 3rd Street / Highway 123, heads north on Main Street for 5 blocks, and terminates at its intersection with Oak Street / Highway 23 (MN 23), Lark Street and Railroad Avenue / Highway 23.

County Highway 65 is a road that serves Pine City. The route begins at the intersection of Main Street (CR 61) and 8th Avenue, heads east on East 8th Avenue for 3 blocks, and terminates at its intersection with 2nd Street (CR 8).

County Highway 66 is a road that serves Askov. The route begins at the intersection of Brogade (CR 33) and Andersensalle (CR 33), heads northeast on Brogade for 1 block, heads north for 2 blocks on Købmagergade and terminates at its intersection with State Highway 23 (MN 23).

CR 101–CR 125

County Road 101 is a road that serves Royalton Township. The route begins as a continuation of 421st Avenue Northeast (Isanti CR 54) when the road becomes 540th Street, heads east , then heads north  along Red Oak Road. The route terminates at the intersection of Red Oak Road with Brunswick Road (CR 5).

County Road 102 is a road that serves Royalton Township and Greeley. The route begins at the intersection of Clint Road with Red Oak Road (CR 101), heads east  along Clint Road, through Greeley along Greeley Loop, then southeast concurrently on Greeley Road (CR 1), continuing east  along Farming Road, and terminating with its intersection with Elmcrest Avenue (CR 103).

County Road 103 is a road that serves Royalton Township, West Rock and Rock Creek. The route begins at the intersection of 540th Street with Elmcrest Avenue, heads north  along Elmcrest Avenue, east  along 580th Street, north  along Ruby Road and terminates at its intersection with Pearl Avenue (CR 5). Ruby Road continues north as County Road 5.

County Road 104 is a road that serves Rock Creek in two discontinuous segments. The western segment begins at the intersection of 550th Street with Elmcrest Avenue (CR 103), heads east for  along 550th Street, and terminates with its intersection with Falcon Avenue (CR 23). Maple Avenue continues as County Highway 3.

References

Minnesota Department of Transportation: Geographic Information & Mapping

Transportation in Pine County, Minnesota
Pine
Pine